Gustav Jezek was a Czechoslovakian luger who competed during the late 1930s. He won the bronze medal in the men's singles event at the 1939 European luge championships at Reichenberg, Czechoslovakia (now Liberec, Czech Republic).

References
List of European luge champions 

Czechoslovak male lugers
Year of birth missing
Year of death missing